The House of Switzerland is a Swiss hospitality centre, meeting point, and social hub. The new house ("Swiss Mobile House") was developed by Presence Switzerland in 2013, for the 2014 Winter Olympics; on 15 February 2014, Vladimir Putin visited it and ate a raclette there.

The prefabricated house is designed to be mobile and was re-used in other occasions, such as Expo 2015.

Notes and references

External links 
 

2013 establishments in Switzerland
Foreign relations of Switzerland
Federal Department of Foreign Affairs